Chrome Rats Vs. Basement Rutz is the debut studio album by Chromatics, released in 2003 on the Gold Standard Laboratories record label.

Track listing

Personnel
Hannah Blilie: Drums, percussion, vocals
Johnny Jewel: Percussion, producer
Adam Miller: Bass, percussion, vocals
Michelle Nolan: Bass, guitar, vocals 
Devin Welch: Bass, guitar, synthesizer

References

2003 debut albums
Chromatics (band) albums
Gold Standard Laboratories albums